Bertram Grassby (23 December 1880 – 7 December 1953) was an English actor. He appeared in more than 90 silent era films between 1914 and 1927. Grassby was married to American actress Gerard Alexander. He was born in Lincolnshire, England and died in Scottsdale, Arizona.

Selected filmography

His Father's Rifle (1914)
Liberty (1916) as Manuel Leon
Langdon's Legacy (1916)
 It Happened in Honolulu (1916)
The Mysterious Mrs. M (1917)
 Even As You and I (1917)
Rasputin, The Black Monk (1917)
 The Soul of Satan (1917)
 Cheating the Public (1918)
Salomé (1918) as Prince David
The Hope Chest (1918) as Stoughton Lounsbury
A Romance of Happy Valley (1919) as Judas
The Delicious Little Devil (1919) as Duke de Sauterne
Fools and Their Money (1919) as Cholly Van Dusen
The Gray Horizon (1919) as John Furthman
The Lone Wolf's Daughter (1919) as Michael Lanyard, the Lone Wolf
What Every Woman Wants (1919)
 Yvonne from Paris (1919)
The Woman and the Puppet (1920)
The Week-End (1920)
 For the Soul of Rafael (1920) 
Mid-Channel (1920)
 Hush (1921)
 Hold Your Horses (1921)
 Straight from Paris (1921)
A Parisian Scandal (1921) as Baron Stransky
 Fifty Candles (1921)
For the Defense (1922)
 Shattered Dreams (1922)
The Prisoner (1923) as Prince Ugo Ravorelli
The Man from Brodney's (1923)
 Pioneer Trails (1923)
 The Dancer of the Nile (1923)
His Hour (1924) as Boris Varishkine
The Shadow of the Desert (1924)
 One Law for the Woman (1924)
 The Heart Bandit (1924)
 Fools in the Dark (1924)
She Wolves (1925)
 Havoc (1925)
 The Girl on the Stairs (1925)
Made for Love (1926)
 The Taxi Mystery (1926)
 The Beautiful Cheat (1926)
When a Man Loves (1927)

References

External links

1880 births
1953 deaths
English male film actors
English male silent film actors
20th-century English male actors